Hussein, Hussain, Hossein, Hossain, Huseyn, Husayn, Husein or Husain, coming from the triconsonantal root Ḥ-S-N , is an Arabic name which is the diminutive of Hassan, meaning "good", "handsome" or "beautiful". It is commonly given as a male given name, particularly among Shias. 
In Persian language contexts, the transliterations  Ḥosayn, Hosayn, or Hossein are sometimes used.
In the transliteration of Indo-Aryan languages, the forms "Hussain" or "Hossain" may be used.
Other variants include Husên, Husejin, Husejn, Husain, Hisên, Hussain, Husayin, Hussayin, Hüseyin, Husseyin, Huseyn, Hossain, Hosein,  Husseyn (etc.).  The Encyclopaedia of Islam, which follows a standardized way for transliterating Arabic names, used the form "Ḥusain" in its first edition and "Ḥusayn" in its second and third editions.

This name was not used in the pre-Islamic period, and is recorded to have been first used by the Islamic prophet Muhammad when he named his grandson Husayn ibn Ali, saying he had been commanded to do so by Allah through the archangel Gabriel.

Given name

Hossein
 Hossein Alizadeh, Iranian musician
 Hossein Fekri, Iranian footballer
 Hossein Ghanbari, Iranian footballer
 Hossein Marashi, Iranian politician
 Hossein Namazi, Iranian economist and politician
 Hossein Navab, Iranian diplomat
 Hossein Nuri, Iranian artist
 Hossein Panahi, Iranian actor
 Hossein Rajabian, Iranian filmmaker
 Hossein Rezazadeh, Iranian weightlifter
 Hossein Tehrani, Iranian musician
 Hossein Valamanesh (1949–2022), Iranian-born Australian artist
 Hossein Moghadami (2003-present), Iranian scientist based in italy

Houssein
 Houssein Rizk (born 1997), Lebanese footballer

Husain

Husayn
 Husayn ibn Ali, the grandson of Muhammad
 Husayn (Safavid), former Safavid king of Persia
 Husayn Bayqarah, Timurid ruler of Herat from 1469 to his death
 Husayn ibn Hamdan, a general in the Abbasid Caliphate
 Husayn ibn Numayr, a general of the Umayyad Caliphate

Husein
 Husein Gradaščević, Bosniak 19th-century leader and rebel
 Husein Miljković, Bosnian military commander
 Husein Kavazović, Grand Mufti of Bosnia and Herzegovina
 Husein Alicajic, Australian filmmaker
 Husein Balić, Austrian footballer
 Husein Beganović, Macedonian footballer

Hussain
 Hussain Ahmed, Emirati basketball player
 Hussain Sajwani (born 1952/53), Emirati billionaire property developer
Hussain Karim (born 1974), Canadian filmmaker and cinematographer

Hussein
 Hussein Adan Isack (born 1957), Kenyan naturalist, ethnobiologist and ornithology research scientist
 Hussein M. Adam (1943–2017), Somali professor of political science
 Hussein bin Ali, Sharif of Mecca, Sherif and Emir of Mecca
 Hussein Chalayan, British/Turkish Cypriot fashion designer
 Hussein el-Husseini, former Lebanese Parliament Speaker
 Hussein Hasan, Somali poet and warrior
 Hussein Fatal, American rap artist from 2Pac's Outlawz group
 Hussein Hamdan, Lebanese football player
 Hussein Ibish (born 1963), American academic 
 Hussein ibn Ali, grandson of the prophet Muhammad and son of Caliph Ali ibn Abi Talib
 Hussein Kamel al-Majid, son-in-law of Saddam Hussein
 Hussein Kamel of Egypt, Sultan of Egypt
 Hussein Naeem, Lebanese football player
 Hussein of Jordan, King of Jordan
 Hussein Onn, third Prime Minister of Malaysia
 Hussein Zedan (1953–2019), Egyptian computer scientist
 Hussein Zein (born 1995), Lebanese footballer

Hüseyin
 Hüseyin Alkan (born 1988), Turkish Paralympian goalball player
 Hüseyin Avni (disambiguation), multiple people
 Hüseyin Çapkın (born 1951), Turkish police chief
 Hüseyin Dündar (born 1986), Turkish boxer
 Hüseyin Er (1985–2021), British-Turkish deaf football player
 Hüseyin Erkan (born 1958), Turkish high-ranking civil servant
 Hüseyin Hilmi Işık (1911–2001), Turkish Islamic scholar
 Hüseyin Kandemir (born 1986), Turkish rower
 Hüseyin Kıvrıkoğlu (born 1934), Turkish general
 Hüseyin Koç (born 1979), Turkish volleyball player
 Hüseyin Özer (born 1949), Turkish-British executive chef and restaurateur
 Hüseyin Sayram (1905–1988), Turkish politician
 Hüseyin Tavur (born 1972), Turkish football manager
 Hüseyin Yıldırım (born 1928), convicted Turkish spy of Cold War era
 Hüseyin Yıldız (born 1979), Turkish futsal player

Huseyn
 Huseyn Arablinski (1881–1919), Azerbaijani actor
 Huseyn Derya (1975–2014), Azerbaijani rapper and actor
 Huseyn Javid (1882–1941), Azerbaijani poet and playwright
 Huseyn Khan Nakhchivanski (1863–1919), Russian Cavalry General of Azerbaijani origin
 Huseyn Seyidzadeh (1910–1979), Azerbaijani film director
 Huseyn Shaheed Suhrawardy (1892–1963), Bengali politician and statesman

Hüseyin 

 Hüseyin Gezer (1920–2013), Turkish sculptor

Hossain
 Rubel Hossain, Bangladeshi cricketer
 Mosaddek Hossain Saikat, Bangladeshi cricketer

Middle name
 Amin Hossein Rahimi (born 1968), Iranian politician
 Barack Hussein Obama II, 44th President of the United States
 Barack Hussein Obama, Sr., father of the forty-fourth US president
 Khadim Hussain Rizvi, Pakistani Muslim scholar and politician
 Saddam Hussein, Saddam Hussein Abd al-Majid al-Tikriti, fifth President of Iraq

Patronymic title
 Ali ibn Husayn Zayn al-Abidin, Islamic scholar of the Umayyad era. He is considered 4th shia Imam by the Twelver, Zaydi and Isma'ili shia sects.
 Ali ibn Husayn, son of Husayn ibn Ali
 Ali al-Asghar ibn Husayn
 Ruqayya bint Husayn, daughter of Husayn ibn Ali
 Fatimah bint Husayn, also known as Fatimah as-Sughra
 Fatimah bint Husayn was the daughter of Husayn ibn Ali and his wife Umm Ishaq bint Talha
 Tahir ibn Husayn, Abbasid general and governor under Al-Ma'mun (r. 813–833)
 Abdullah bin Hussein, also known as Abdullah I, was the King of Jordan from 25 May 1946 – 20 July 1951

Surname

Hossain
 Abdul Mannan Hossain, Indian politician
 Adil Hussain, Indian actor
 Akbar Hossain, Bangladeshi politician
 Anwar Hossain (disambiguation), several people
 Ashraf Hossain, Bangladeshi politician
 Delwar Hossain Sayeedi, Bangladeshi Islamic lecturer and politician
 Faisal Hossain, Bangladeshi cricketer
 Hasibul Hossain, Bangladeshi cricketer
 Ismail Hossain Siraji, Bengali writer
 Kamal Hossain, Bangladeshi politician
 Makbul Hossain, Bangladeshi politician
 Md. Mokbul Hossain, Bangladeshi politician
 Md. Mokbul Hossain Meherpuri, Bangladeshi politician
 Mehrab Hossain (disambiguation), several people
 Mir Mosharraf Hossain, Bengali writer
 M Makbul Hossain, Bangladesh Navy rear admiral
 Mockbul Hossain, Bangladeshi businessman
 Mohammed Mosharref Hossain, Bangladeshi criminal
 Mohammad Nazmul Hossain, Bangladeshi cricketer
 Mokbul Hossain, Bangladeshi politician
 Mokbul Hossain Sujanagari, Bangladeshi politician
 Nina Hossain, English journalist and presenter
 Noor Hossain (disambiguation), several people
 Saber Hossain Chowdhury, Bangladeshi politician
 Sadeque Hossain Khoka, Bangladeshi politician
 Sanwar Hossain, Bangladeshi cricketer
 Selina Hossain, Bengali writer
 Shahadat Hossain, Bangladeshi cricketer
 Shahriar Hossain, Bangladeshi cricketer
 Zakir Hossain (disambiguation), several people

Hosein / Hossein
 Farah Hussein (born 2001), Egyptian gymnast
Mehnaz Hoosein (born 1973), Indian singer
 Robert Hossein, French actor, director and writer
 Imran N. Hosein, Islamic scholar specialising in Islamic eschatology
 Akeal Hosein, West Indian cricketer

Husain

Hussain
 Abrar Hussain (1961–2011), Pakistani boxer
 Abrar Hussain, Pakistani military hero
 Hasib Hussain, British Islamic terrorist and perpetrator of the 7/7 attacks
 Ijaz Hussain, Pakistani cricketer
 Nasser Hussain, Essex and England cricketer
 Nauman Hussain, American businessman implicated in the Schoharie limousine crash
 Rashad Hussain, United States special envoy to the Organization of the Islamic Conference
 Roquia Sakhawat Hussain, Bangladeshi feminist and social worker
 Rizwan Hussain, British Barrister of Bangladeshi Descent
 Syed Abdulla Hussain, Indian ornithologist
 Zakir Hussain (disambiguation), several people

Husayn
 Muhammad Husayn Haykal, Egyptian writer, journalist, and politician

Hussein
 Abdul Razak Hussein, Prime Minister of Malaysia
 Adnan Hussein (born 1954), Lebanese politician
 Ali bin Hussein of Hejaz, King of Hejaz and Grand Sharif of Mecca
 Ameena Hussein (born 1964), Sri Lankan writer, editor and sociologist
 Fouad Hussein, Jordanian journalist
 Mahmoud Hussein, Egyptian journalist
 Mohd Faizol Hussien, Malaysian football player
 Nedal Hussein, Australian boxer of the 1990s and 2000s
 Omar Abdel Hamid El-Hussein, Danish gunman in the 2015 Copenhagen shootings
 Sadqa Hussein (1876–1961), rabbinical judge of the Iraqi Jews in Jerusalem
 Sharif Ali bin al-Hussein, Pretender to the Iraqi throne and the leader of the Iraqi Constitutional Monarchy political party
 Shelomo Bekhor Hussein (1843–1892), rabbi, author, and publisher in Baghdad, Ottoman Iraq
 Taha Hussein, Egyptian writer and Arabic literary scholar
Youssef Hussein (born 1988), Egyptian comedian

Family of Saddam Hussein of Iraq
 Saddam Hussein, former President of Iraq (1979–2003)
 Uday Hussein, son 
 Qusay Hussein, son
 Raghad Hussein, daughter
 Rana Hussein, daughter 
 Hala Hussein, daughter

Royal family of Jordan
 Abdullah II bin al-Hussein, King of the Hashemite Kingdom of Jordan
 Ali bin Hussein of Jordan, son of King Hussein of Jordan and his third wife
 Alia al Hussein, third wife of King Hussein of Jordan
 Hussein, Crown Prince of Jordan (born 1994), son of Abdullah II
 Princess Muna al-Hussein, second wife of King Hussein of Jordan

Huseyin / Hüseyin
 Metin Hüseyin, English film director

Huseyn / Hüseyn
 Mehdi Huseyn (1909–1965), Azerbaijani and Soviet writer and critic

Huseynov / Guseynov / Гусейнов
 Abdusalam Guseynov, Lezgian philosopher and ethicist

See also
 Abdul Hussein, Arabic theophoric name
 Arabic name
 Houssin
 Husseini
 Al Hussein (missile), an Iraqi ballistic missile

References

Arabic-language surnames
Arabic masculine given names
Iranian masculine given names
Turkish-language surnames
Bengali Muslim surnames
Indian surnames
Turkish masculine given names
Surnames of Maldivian origin
Maldivian-language surnames
yi:כוסיין